"Then Came You" is the debut single from dance-pop and freestyle project T.P.E. from their album T.P.E. Featuring Adam Marano, released in 1991. This was the only single from T.P.E. to reach the charts, peaking at number 91 on the Billboard Hot 100 in the United States.

Track listing
 US 12" single

Charts

References

1991 debut singles
T.P.E. songs
Song articles with missing songwriters
1991 songs